This is a list of karst springs. There are different types of karst springs, including inversacs (or estavelles), Vauclusian springs, vruljas, and others. All of them form in limestone settings.

References

Karst
Karst springs list